The 1953 Auckland City mayoral election was part of the New Zealand local elections held that same year. In 1953, elections were held for the Mayor of Auckland plus other local government positions including twenty-one city councillors. The polling was conducted using the standard first-past-the-post electoral method.

Background
Long serving incumbent mayor John Allum was successfully challenged by former magistrate John Luxford. Allum was the first mayor in the 20th century who had stood for re-election unsuccessfully. Luxford was endorsed by the new United Independents electoral ticket who gained the balance of power between the Labour Party and Citizens & Ratepayers, costing the latter the majority they had held since 1938.

Stewart was selected as Labour's nominee but later withdrew his candidacy prompting the party to re-open nominations. Labour selected a replacement candidate, Richard Newell Stephen Joseph Wrathall, to replace Stewart. He was an engineering clerk and both an executive member of the Auckland Trades Council and Clerical Workers' Union. Just over a month before the election, Wrathall was removed as a candidate after he was suspended as a member of the party. The party subsequently did not select a replacement mayoral candidate.

A major talking point in the lead up to the election was the potential of a clash with the 1953 Royal Tour. There were proposals to postpone local elections until early 1954 over fears of reduced turnout due to a conflicted schedule. The proposals were considered by the Minister of Internal Affairs William Bodkin, who ultimately decided against it.

Mayoralty results

Councillor results

Notes

References

Mayoral elections in Auckland
1953 elections in New Zealand
Politics of the Auckland Region
1950s in Auckland
November 1953 events in New Zealand